Eastwood is a suburb of Sydney, Australia. Eastwood is located 17 kilometres north-west of the Sydney central business district in the local government areas of the City of Ryde and the City of Parramatta. Eastwood is in the Western Sydney region (although it is commonly regarded as a suburb of Northern Sydney due to it being partially in the City of Parramatta). The area is best known for being an ethnic enclave for immigrant populations in Sydney, mainly of East Asian origin but the suburb also has a significant number of other immigrant populations. Eastwood was originally its own town but due to the expansion of Sydney, was eventually absorbed.

Originally thought to have been inhabited by the Wallumedegal Aboriginal tribe, who lived in the area between the Lane Cove and Parramatta Rivers, the area was first settled by Europeans shortly after the arrival of the First Fleet in 1788, from land grants to Royal Marines and New South Wales Corps, and was named "Eastwood" by an early Irish free settler, William Rutledge. Today it is a large suburban centre in the north of Sydney of over 17,000 people, with a large shopping area. Eastwood has a large population of Asian descent with immigrants from China and South Korea transforming the commercial precinct in the past decade.

Eastwood is famous for the Granny Smith apple, accidentally first grown in the suburb by Maria Ann Smith. Every October, the oval and cordoned-off streets become the grounds for the annual Granny Smith Festival, a celebration of the icon with fairground rides, market stalls, street theatres, parades, an apple-baking competition and a fireworks spectacular at the Upper Eastwood Oval. In recent years the festival has been influenced by the substantial Asian immigrant communities, with Chinese dragon dancers in the Grand Parade and Chinese stallholders. During the same period, Eastwood's annual Chinese New Year Celebrations have broadened their appeal by incorporating concurrent Korean New Year traditions, and have accordingly been renamed the Lunar New Year Festivities.

Geography
Eastwood is located at the edge of the Hornsby Plateau with the suburbs of Dundas Valley and Denistone on its western and southern sides, respectively, as the land falls away down to the Cumberland Plain. To the north, Eastwood is bounded by the transport hub of Epping and to its east Marsfield which shares the same postcode of 2122. The suburb is predominantly residential with the main shopping area of Eastwood centred between Rowe Street and Rutledge Street around the railway line.

History

The Wallumedegal aboriginal tribe lived in the area between the Lane Cove River and Parramatta River, which was known as Walumetta. The area was originally heavily timbered.

The area was first settled by Europeans shortly after the arrival of the First Fleet in 1788 and is located in the Field of Mars Parish, and was part of the Field of Mars Common located in its northern area. The area of Eastwood was originally granted between the years of 1790 and 1803 to marines and the New South Wales Corps. John Love, a private was granted  here in 1794, described as North Brush, in the Field of Mars Common. The land was then acquired by William Kent who already held land in what is now Epping. The land was purchased by William Rutledge for 288 pounds in 1835, who built 'Eastwood House' in 1840. This house is now part of Marist College Eastwood. Scottish born John Ross, who was part of the "squattocracy", owned Eastwood from 1860 until 1863. He reputedly paid £60 000 for it. In 1863 Edward Terry purchased the estate and upon his death in 1905, the estate was sub-divided.

In 1886, the Main Northern railway line from Strathfield to Hornsby was opened, with a station here originally called Dundas. This was changed a year later to Eastwood, named after the Eastwood Estate.

The commercial centre underwent a major upgrade in the early 1980s. Rowe Street, which originally ran across the railway line through a level crossing was turned into a mall between The Avenue and West Parade, and the 1940s bridge built in First Avenue for crossing traffic was replaced with a six-lane bridge. This bridge was to service the planned County of Cumberland Scheme, Eastwood County Road (linking Eastwood with Macquarie Park), a road project in the local area which has been controversial among locals.

Commercial area

The Eastwood commercial district is located around Eastwood railway station.

Eastwood Shopping Centre, built in 1976 on the former Odeon Theatre and is a 2-storey centre that once featured Target, Tandy Electronics, BBC Hardware and Woolworths. However, due to growth in nearby Macquarie Centre and Top Ryde City these stores have all closed, leaving Woolworths as the sole anchor tenant. 

Eastwood Village (formerly Westfield Eastwood) is a shopping centre located on Progress Avenue. Westfield Eastwood opened in 1964 and featured Mark Foy's. The store became a McDowells store and then a Waltons 1972. In 1994, the Waltons store closed and the Westfield Group sold the centre and is now called Eastwood Village which included Franklins (rebranded to IGA in 2011–2015).

Eastwood Plaza is located on the pedestrianised section of Rowe Street. The Plaza features a fountain and several cafes with outdoor seating. Eastwood is becoming well known as an Asian shopping precinct, with speciality stores, supermarkets and many restaurants run by Chinese and Korean retailers. The ethnic background of its shoppers has created a hub of mainly Chinese, Vietnamese, Cantonese, Singaporean, Hong Kong and Korean restaurants and eateries in the area.

Transport

Eastwood is relatively well served by public transport. Eastwood railway station is located on the Main Northern railway line. The station opened in 1886, and it takes approximately 30–35 minutes to travel to Central.

Numerous Busways bus services also operate from the small interchange outside the station. These include the 545 route between Parramatta and Macquarie Park, the 544 route between Auburn and Macquarie University, and the 515 service to Ryde. Eastwood is also served well by roads, and is located close to the trunk routes of the A6 (Marsden Road), and Victoria Road.

In spite of the range of public transport options, the 2016 census found that only 31% of employed people travelled to work on public transport and 53% by car (either as driver or as passenger).

Landmarks

Brush Farm House on Marsden Road – former home of Gregory Blaxland, one of the explorers of the Blue Mountains. It is included on the NSW State Heritage Register and the National Trust of Australia register.
Eastwood House – the former home of Edward Terry, the original landowner of the estate on which Eastwood is now built, and now part of the administration offices of the local Marist Brothers Secondary College. It is Heritage Listed.
Eastwood Park Grandstand and Pavilion – these date from 1933 and 1935 respectively.  The croquet pavilion is still in use for its original purpose, associated with the Eastwood Croquet Club, and available for hire by the local community.  Both are Heritage listed.
Ripley (14 Auld Avenue) was built in 1907, on the 1897 Bush Farm Estate subdivision. The house, designed by architect George W Durrell, is an example of the Federation Arts and Crafts style, rare in the Eastwood area.  It is Heritage listed.
Ryde Hospital on Denistone Road is a public hospital with between 100 and 199 beds and an emergency department.
Eastwood Library on the Corner Hillview Road and West Parade.
Corrective Services Academy, a training centre for prison officers, is on the site of what was previously Brush Farm Public School.
Eastwood once featured a lake which gave the names Lakeside Road and The Lakeside Road Uniting Church. This lake was later converted to an oval which is used for soccer matches and by local schools. The oval still occasionally floods after heavy rainfall.

Forest reserves
Darvall Park and Brush Farm Park are examples of remnant forest areas in the Eastwood district. Volunteers and professional bush regenerators have worked to preserve the Blue Gum High Forest and rainforest in these areas. The largest tree heath known in existence occurs at Brush Farm park. Other notable plants include native crabapple, jackwood and red olive berry. Despite being within a large city, Brush Farm has remarkable fauna, including the powerful owl, emerald dove, eastern whipbird, satin bowerbird and the green tree snake.

Housing

At the 2016 census, more than half (56.9%) of occupied private dwellings in Eastwood were separate houses, 23.6% were flats, units or apartments, and 18.4% were semi-detached or townhouses. Three-quarters (75.1%) were family households, 18.5% were single person households and 6.3% were group households.  The average household size was 2.9 people.

Housing consists of many Californian Bungalow and Federation homes, especially in streets located closer to the station. More post World War II homes can be seen further from the station, especially to the north of Terry Road. While most of Eastwood is residential, with one or two-storey detached houses and villas, the area surrounding the town centre boasts buildings up to seven storeys high. In 2006 the City of Ryde developed a Control Plan for the Eastwood Town Centre, which includes the provision of buildings of up to ten storeys high in the shopping and railway areas. Former industrial parts of the suburb are also undergoing redevelopment. The former brickworks site was converted into a housing estate.

Churches
 Christ Evangelical Centre of Australia (CECA)
 Eastwood Baptist Church
 Exclusive Brethren Church
 Lakeside Road Uniting Church (former Methodist Church)
 Macquarie Chapel – Pastor Richard Quadrio started the church in 2001. It is combined with Macquarie Presbyterian Church.
 St Andrew's Uniting Church – (former Presbyterian Church): Demolished and now merged with Lakeside Uniting Church
 St Kevin's Catholic Church – this church was completed in 1994 to replace the original church, which is now the library of the local Catholic school (St Kevins.)
 St Philip's Anglican Church was founded over 100 years ago, and has met in the current church building since 1907.
 Cornerstone Presbyterian Community Church Eastwood (meets at Eastwood Heights Public School)
 St Georges Anglican Church, Balaclava Road, Eastwood Heights
 St Dunstan's Anglican Church, Lovell Road, Eastwood
 The Church of Jesus Christ of Latter-day Saints, Blaxland Road, Denistone East
 The Crusader Union of Australia, known as Crusaders, is based in Eastwood.

Schools
Primary Schools
 Eastwood Heights Public School
 Eastwood Public School
 St Kevins Eastwood (Catholic primary school)

High Schools
 Marist College Eastwood

Culture and events

Eastwood is well known as the place where the Granny Smith apple was first grown. This is celebrated each October with the Granny Smith Festival which attracts over 60,000 people each year. Granny Smith is a local legend and more can be read about her on a number of historical websites.

Population
Today it is a large suburban centre in the north of Sydney with over 17,000 residents. Over the past few decades Eastwood has become increasingly multicultural. Migrants from southern Europe countries such as Italy and Greece began settling here and at Carlingford from the 1960s. From the early eighties onwards, many Chinese and Koreans settled in the area.

Demographics 
At the 2016 census, the suburb of Eastwood recorded a population of 17,865 people.  Of these:
 Age distribution  Compared to the national average, Eastwood has a higher number of residents aged between 20 and 34.  Eastwood residents' median age was 36 years, compared to the national median of 38. Children aged under 15 years made up 15.2% of the population (national average is 18.7%) and people aged 65 years and over made up 14.1% of the population (national average is 15.8%).
 Ethnic diversity  Well under half (38.0%) of Eastwood residents were born in Australia; the next most common countries of birth were China (25.3%), South Korea (7.8%), Hong Kong (4.7%), India (2.5%) and Malaysia (1.8%).  However, only 10.1% identify their ancestry as Australian; the other common self-identified ancestries were Chinese (38.4%), English (11.2%), Korean (8.2%) and Irish (4.2%). Less than a third (32.3%) of the residents spoke only English at home; other languages spoken at home included Mandarin (25.0%), Cantonese (14.9%), Korean (9.4%), Tamil (1.4%) and Indonesian (0.9%).
 Religion  This question is optional in the Census.  Of the people who answered it, the most common response was "No Religion" (39.4%); the next most common responses were Catholic (17.6%), Buddhism (6.6%) and Anglican (6.5%).
 Income  The median weekly household income was $1,648, somewhat higher than the national median of $1,438.

Residents
 The band All Mankind, best known for the song "Break the Spell" are residents of Eastwood

Former residents 
 Natalie Bennett, former leader of the Green Party of England and Wales
 Reg Campbell – portrait painter and self-taught artist
 Lenny Hayes – former Australian rules footballer with 
 Geoffrey Robertson – human rights lawyer, academic, author and broadcaster
 Aziz Shavershian – bodybuilder and internet personality
 Maria Ann Smith – orchardist, who is known for growing the first Granny Smith apples

References

External links

 A Brief History of Ryde (Including Eastwood)
  [CC-By-SA]
 

 
Suburbs of Sydney
City of Parramatta
City of Ryde